The 59th Japan Record Awards was held on 30 December 2017. The Tokyo Broadcasting System Television network televised the show live from the New National Theatre Tokyo in Tokyo. Radio broadcast was through TBS Radio. The broadcast ran from 18:30 (JST) to 22:00 (JST). Yūki Amami and Shinichiro Azumi hosted the ceremony for the second time. The nominations and award winners were announced by TBS on 16 November 2017.

The 59th Japan Record Award went to idol group Nogizaka46 for their song "Influencer". This was the second consecutive win for an artist under the Sony Music Entertainment Japan label (after Kana Nishino in 2016). Tsubaki Factory won the Best New Artist Award.

The average audience rating for the second part (19:00 to 22:00) was 14.4%, down 0.1% from the previous year's broadcast.

Presenters
 Yūki Amami
 Shinichiro Azumi (TBS Announcer)

Progress announcers
 Ai Etō (TBS Announcer)
 Yumi Furuya (TBS Announcer)

Radio relay host
 Kengo Komada (TBS Announcer)

Nominees and winners

Grand Prix
 "Influencer"
 Artist: Nogizaka46
 Lyrics: Yasushi Akimoto
 Composition: Shinya Sumida
 Arranger: Apazzi
 Producer: Yasushi Akimoto
 Management company: Nogizaka46 LLC
 Record Company: Sony Music Entertainment Japan

Excellent works Award
Also the Grand Prix nominations
 Kana Nishino – "Te o Tsunagu Riyuu"
 AKB48 – "Negaigoto no Mochigusare"
 AAA – "Life"
 Keyakizaka46 – "Kaze ni Fukaretemo"
 Nogizaka46 – "Influencer"
 Hiroshi Miyama – "Otoko no Ryuugi"
 Kiyoshi Hikawa – "Otoko no Zesshou"
 Sekai no Owari – "Rain"
 Daichi Miura – "Excite"
 Ai – "Kira Kira feat. Kanna"

Best New Artist Award
 Tsubaki Factory

New Artist Award
Also the Best New Artist nominations
 Tsubaki Factory
 Takuya Nagazawa
 Nobu
 Unione

Special Award
 Yū Aku
 Namie Amuro
 Yōko Oginome and Tomioka High School Dance Club – "Dancing Hero (Eat You Up)"
 Yuzu
 Akiko Wada

Best Singer Award
 Yoshimi Tendo

Recommendation Award
Awarded by the Japan Composer's Association
 Konomi Mori

Special Honour Award
 Miyako Ootsuki

Achievement Award
 Yukihiko Itō (composer)
 Ryūtarō Konishi (music reporter)
 Jun Suzuki (composer)
 Kyōhei Tsutsumi (composer)
 Shōhei Mozu (lyricist)
 Reiko Yukawa (music critic)

Special Achievement Award
 Hirooki Ogawa (composer)
 Hiroshi Kamayatsu (singer)
 Jun Kitahara (composer)
 Kōmei Sone (composer)
 Masaaki Hirao (composer)
 Tooru Funamura (composer)
 Peggy Hayama (singer)

Composer Award
 Katsuhide Sugiyama – "Zutto, Futari de" (singer: Leo Ieiri)

Lyricist Award
 Hideaki Tokunaga – "Baton" (singer: Hideaki Tokunaga)

Arranger Award
 Yasutaka Nakata – "Ryō Star", "Harajuku Iyahoi" (singer: Kyary Pamyu Pamyu)

Best Album Award
 Suchmos – The Kids

Excellence Album Award
 Keisuke Kuwata – Garakuta
 Kumiko with Kazemachi Review – Déraciné
 Ren Takada – Night Riders Blues
 Hiromi Uehara x Edmar Castañeda – Live In Montreal

Planning Award
 Yutaro Miura – I'm Home
 Hanawa – Ogifu-san
 The KanLeKeeZ – G.S. meets The KanLeKeeZ
 Seiko Matsuda – Seiko Jazz
 Walt Disney Records/Avex Entertainment – Beauty and the Beast Original Soundtrack
 Hiroshi Itsuki – Toru Funamura Tribute Album: Eien no Funamura Melody

References

External links
 

2017
Japan Record Awards
Japan Record Awards
Japan Record Awards
Japan Record Awards